Frank Herbert Dedrick Pickersgill (May 28, 1915 – September 14, 1944) was a Canadian Special Operations Executive agent.

Biography 
Born in Winnipeg, Manitoba, Pickersgill graduated from Kelvin High School in that city. Holding an English degree from the University of Manitoba and a Master's degree in classics from the University of Toronto, Pickersgill set out to cycle across Europe in 1934, then returned to Europe in 1938 to work as a freelance journalist for several Canadian newspapers. During his travels he met Jean-Paul Sartre, whose work he hoped to translate into English, though the oncoming war distracted him from the project.

Pickersgill served the first two years of the war in Saint-Denis Internment Camp (Stalag 220) as an enemy alien. He escaped by sawing out a window with a hacksaw blade smuggled into the camp in a loaf of bread.

Once he was safely back in Britain, he rejected the offer of a desk job in Ottawa and instead received a commission in the newly created Canadian Intelligence Corps. Because he was fluent in German, Latin, Greek and especially French, he worked in close contact with the British Special Operations Executive (SOE). Along with a fellow Canadian, John Kenneth Macalister, he was parachuted into the Loire Valley in occupied France on June 20, 1943, to work with the French Resistance. Both men were picked up by the SOE agent Yvonne Rudellat (codename 'Jacqueline') and the French officer Pierre Culioli. Their vehicle stopped at a German checkpoint in Dhuizon, and after Rudellat and Culioli were cleared they decided to wait for the two Canadians to come through. Minutes later, however, the Canadians' cover was blown and Culioli tried to speed away but he and Rudellat were captured when they ran into another checkpoint about 10 kilometres away. Rudellat subsequently died in Bergen-Belsen; Culioli survived the war.

In March 1944, Pickersgill tried to escape from SD headquarters at 84 Avenue Foch. He attacked a guard with a bottle and threw himself out of a second-storey window.  He was shot several times and recaptured. He was then interned with other agents in a camp at Ravitsch, 25 miles North of Breslau.

On August 27, 1944, he was shipped with members of the Robert Benoist group to Buchenwald concentration camp, where he was executed on September 14, along with 35 other SOE agents, including two other Canadians, Roméo Sabourin and John Kenneth Macalister. Though there are conflicting reports about their deaths, the men are thought to have been hung on meat hooks and strangled with piano wire. Their bodies were incinerated.

After the war, SOE's Vera Atkins interviewed Josef Kiefer, former head of the German SD in Paris.  Kiefer named Pickersgill as one of three SOE agents he knew who successfully resisted all German efforts to obtain information from them. Two other successful resistors he named were Noor Inayat Khan and France Antelme.

Posthumously, the government of France awarded Pickersgill the Legion of Honour, and he is listed as one of the SOE agents who died for the liberation of France on the "Roll of Honour" on the Valençay SOE Memorial in Valençay in the département of the Indre. He is commemorated by an obelisk at Romorantin-Lanthenay, where he is one of 4 members of SOE to be listed. He is also honoured on the Groesbeek Memorial in the Groesbeek Canadian War Cemetery in the Netherlands. The University of Toronto designated a Pickersgill-Macalister Garden on the west side of the "Soldiers' Tower" monument, but later the plot was rededicated "in memory of those tho gave their lives for peace and freedom", though there is still a plaque saying that it was originally dedicated to Macalister and Pickersgill.

Frank Pickersgill was the younger brother of Jack Pickersgill, a member of the House of Commons of Canada and a Cabinet minister.

Further reading

 The Pickersgill Letters, written by Pickersgill during the period 1934-43, was published by George H. Ford in 1948. The book was republished in 1978 by McClelland & Stewart in an expanded edition under the title The Making of a Secret Agent: Letters of 1934-1943.
 In 2004, two of his letters sent to his family from Central Europe in 1939 were published by Charlotte Gray in Canada: A Portrait in Letters.
 His story and that of Ken Macalister were retold in Unlikely Soldiers: How Two Canadians Fought the Secret War Against Nazi Occupation, by Jonathan Vance (HarperCollins, 2008). This book used material recently made available from SOE files to tell a more complete story of their endeavours than had previously been possible.

Notes

External links 
 CWGC: Frank Herbert Dedrick Pickersgill

1915 births
1944 deaths
Executed spies
Recipients of the Legion of Honour
Canadian people who died in Buchenwald concentration camp
Spies who died in Nazi concentration camps
Special Operations Executive personnel
University of Toronto alumni
University of Manitoba alumni
Canadian escapees
Canadian military personnel killed in World War II
People executed by torture
Canadian people executed in Nazi concentration camps
Canadian Army personnel of World War II
Canadian military personnel from Manitoba
People from Winnipeg
People interned during World War II
Canadian Army officers
Canadian Intelligence Corps officers